The Bishop's School is an independent college preparatory Episcopal day school located at 7607 La Jolla Boulevard in La Jolla, a community of San Diego.  Bishop's offers courses for students in the sixth through twelfth grades and has a 9:1 student-teacher ratio.

History
Bishop's was founded in 1909 by Ellen Browning Scripps and her half-sister (Eliza) Virginia Scripps, with gifts of land and funding, at the request of the Right Reverend Joseph Horsfall Johnson, at that time Bishop of the Episcopal Diocese of Los Angeles.  Originally, it was a boarding school for girls only.  The earliest parts of the campus were designed by architect Irving Gill, responsible for a multitude of buildings in La Jolla. The current tower building was designed by Carleton Winslow as a replacement for the original Gill tower.

Since the School's inception, the following have served as Head of School:

 Anna Frances O'Hare Bentham (1909–1915);
 Margaret Gilman (1915–1918);
 Marguerite Barton (1918–1921);
 Caroline Cummins (1921–1953);
 Rosamund Larmour Loomis (1953–1962);
 Florence Stowell Bill (1962–1963);
 Ruth Jenkins (1963–1971);
 Philip Perkins (1971–1974);
 Dorothy Anne Williams (1974–1983);
 Michael Teitelman (1983–2009);
 Aimeclaire Lambert Roche (2009–2018);
 Carol Barry (interim; 2018–2019);
 Ron Kim (2019–present).

The School is known for its reputation in academics, arts and athletics.

Bishop's became co-educational after merging with the San Miguel School of San Diego, California in 1971. In June 1983, the boarding department was closed. The school expanded to include sixth grade in the fall of 2009.

Campus
The Bishop's School's 11-acre campus is located in the heart of La Jolla, only one block away from the Pacific Ocean. At the center of the campus is the Quad, a grassy quadrangle that is an important part of school life at Bishop's. Tradition prohibits anyone from setting foot on the Quad before lunch on school days. Most of the school's buildings are situated around the Quad, including three of the school's most prominent buildings: Bentham Hall, St. Mary's Chapel, and the Tower. The school campus contains a total of 12 buildings, the oldest of which was built in 1898. Many of the historic buildings on campus were designed by architect Irving Gill, one of the pioneers of the modern movement in architecture.

The school has been designated a historical landmark by the city of San Diego. Bentham Hall (designed by Irving Gill) was listed as historic in 1994 and the remainder of the campus in 1998. Designated elements include Scripps Hall (Irving Gill, 1910–11), Gilman Hall (Irving Gill and Louis Gill, 1916), St. Mary's Chapel (Carleton Winslow, 1916), The Tower (Carleton Winslow, 1930), Wheeler J. Bailey Library (Carleton Winslow, 1935), and gardens.

Leadership
Ron Kim started as Bishop’s 13th Head of School in August 2019. For the 2018–2019 school year, he served as the interim assistant head of school at The Buckley School in Los Angeles. Prior to Buckley, he was the head of school at BASIS Independent McLean (Virginia) and spent 23 years at Phillips Exeter Academy in Exeter, New Hampshire, where he held various administrative and teaching roles during his distinguished career; the most recent were assistant principal, dean of faculty, history instructor and girls' varsity basketball coach. Ron was the youngest dean of faculty ever appointed at Exeter.

Rankings

The College Board Advanced Placement Program ranked the AP Biology program the strongest in the nation for two consecutive years (2004 & 2005), as Bishop's achieved the highest rate of achievement for medium-sized schools (300–799 students). The Wall Street Journal recognized Bishop's in 2007 for its high matriculation rate to eight selective American colleges.

In 2019, the school was recognized as one of the top 20 sought-after private high schools in the country and Niche ranked the school 30th best private high school nationally. In 2020, The Bishop's School was ranked as the No. 1 Christian high school in California, the best private high school in San Diego and the best high school for STEM.

Student activities

Academic League
The Bishop's Academic League team participates in the Northern division of the City League. In 2015 the Bishop's Novice team captained by Hamilton Allport and Ryan Feng won first in the county with an undefeated record. In 2016 the Bishop's Junior Varsity team captained by Hamilton Allport and Ryan Feng placed first with a record of 6-1. The 2019 season saw the team reach greater heights, with Tobey Shim and Yasha Kharrati leading the Junior Varsity to an undefeated 7-0 first place finish. The two also joined Varsity captains Rohit Raguram and Sebastian Hayden in a successful playoffs run which included the team's first-ever city championship title as well as a 2nd-place finish in San Diego County.

Advanced Topics in Economics
In 2015, students in an advanced economics class experienced great success in numerous local, state and national competitions. In the Economics Challenge the teams finished with two of the top five spots. In the Southern California Economics Challenge in Los Angeles the teams placed first and third after a strong finish in the quiz bowl rounds. The team eventually advanced to place sixth in the National Semifinals. Additionally, members of the team traveled to Cambridge, Massachusetts for the Harvard Precollegiate Economics Competition and a meeting with Eric Maskin, the 2007 Nobel Prize winner in the field of Economics. A research team within the class headed by Nikhil Palanki also authored a paper on consumer price index across income levels and was invited to present their research at the 9th Annual Undergraduate Conference, a part of the Economic Scholars Program hosted by the Dallas Federal Reserve. In 2017, the class was restarted and continued to succeed at many national competitions. In the Economics Challenge the teams finished with two of the top five spots and in the Finance Challenge the team took the position of first place in the state of California and fourth in the country. The class, headed and captained by seniors Rachel Hong and Sajan Palanki went on to compete at Harvard Precollegiate Economics Competition and the Stanford Economics Competition and at both Kevin Chen won first place in the country.

Arts
The Bishop's Singers have performed in New York's Carnegie Hall and in Chicago's Symphony Hall, as well as on The Today Show. The school also has a strong visual arts program, featuring student exhibitions and engagement in art competitions.

Athletics
The school (known in competition as the "Knights") currently offers 40 varsity and junior varsity teams.  Sixty percent of Bishop's students compete in one or more sport.

The Knights have had significant success in athletics. The program's 117 California Interscholastic Federation titles ranks fifth among all San Diego schools.

Bishop's is known throughout Southern California as a water polo power, winning the C.I.F. title in boys’ water polo in its district in 2002–2006, 2008, 2010, 2019-2021. The girls’ water polo team won in 2000–2002, 2004–2007, 2011–2018 and 2020-2022.

The 1997 football team, led by Bishop's football coach and former college All-American and NFL safety Shane Walton, won the C.I.F. State Championship. The 2010 football team earned the school's second State Championship after finishing the season 14-0. The Knights defeated Brookside Christian (Stockton) 40-14 in the C.I.F. State Championship Division IV Bowl Game. The 2014 football team went 13-0 and won the C.I.F. San Diego Section Division IV championship, and the 2016 football team also won the C.I.F. San Diego Section Division IV.

Twenty percent of the Knights’ student-athletes go on to play at the collegiate level. McDonald's All-American Destiny Littleton played for South Carolina Gamecocks women's basketball, winning a national championship during the 2021-2022 season. The Knights also had the top boys lacrosse recruit in the nation Isaiah Dawson who now plays for Harvard Men's Lacrosse. Current Notre Dame Fighting Irish Football quarterback Tyler Buchner also attended the school.

Mock Trial
The Bishop's Mock Trial team won the San Diego County championship in 2010–2012, 2014 and 2015. The team is made up of AP U.S. Government students who are completing a class project as first-year players. Numerous graduates have continued to participate in mock trial at the collegiate level at schools such as Duke, University of Illinois, George Washington, Princeton, and Tufts.

Model UN Team
The Bishop's Model United Nations team has participated in regional and national Model UN conferences for over two decades. The Bishop's Model UN Team has won numerous awards, most recently at the Columbia Model United Nations Conference and Exposition, the UCSD Triton MUN conference and the USD MUN conference.  The Secretariat of the Bishop's MUN team also hosts an annual conference for other high schoolers, dubbed KnightsMUN, every December. In 2019, over 150 participants from 20 schools across Southern California attended the conference. Due to concerns over the spread of COVID-19, the 2020 KnightsMUN conference was virtually hosted on Zoom.

School Publications
The School publishes its magazine, "Bishop's," twice a year.
The school also publishes several monthly, daily, and quarterly publications.

Speech and debate team
The Bishop's School Speech and Debate team competes in the San Diego Imperial Valley Speech League (SDIVSL), a division of the California High School Speech Association (CHSSA). The team is the largest single extracurricular on campus including sports teams, boasting upwards of sixty active members in a given school year. They primarily compete in Congressional debate, Parliamentary debate, Lincoln-Douglas debate, and various individual speech events. The team consistently sends several qualifiers to the California State tournament each year.

At the end of the 2018–2019 school year, Tim Kelly (class of 2020), won Debater of the Year for SDIVSL.

Over the course of the 2017-2021 school years, Schuyler Capita (class of 2021) became the first student to qualify for the California State tournament four years in a row.

Spirit team
The Bishop's School does not have a cheerleading squad but has a spirit team called "The Dungeon." The Dungeon is a co-educational spirit team that cheers at various "Knights" athletic events. The Dungeon is responsible for attending all of the athletic events and raising crowds of students to support their peers. Community and school spirit is a fundamental part of the curriculum, and The Dungeon serves as a co-educational spirit team to further student involvement in school life.

Student publications
Bishop's has several student publications. Noteworthy publications include:
The Tower, Bishop's official student newspaper and magazine, published monthly. It covers a variety of topics, but all of them are designed to have some link to Bishop's.
The Daily Urinal, an independent daily newspaper which was founded in 2004 and received its moniker after being posted in campus restrooms. Although originally intended to be a humorous publication, the "DU" has tackled both important and controversial issues at Bishop's. It is distributed daily via email.
 Globe, a student-led magazine, is an annual publication with the purpose of sharing the global and cultural experiences of students and faculty through word and art.
 Reflections, the Upper School Literary Magazine, is an annual publication that accepts prose, poetry, and art of all kinds.
 Dragonwings, the Middle School literary magazine.
Quanta, a science publication, was established at Bishop's in 2010.
Spectrum, a student diversity newsletter, distributed monthly via email, was established at Bishop's in 2016.
Eye on Visual Arts, an art publication, was established at Bishop's in 2019.

Notable alumni

Pancho Barnes — 1910s, pioneering female aviator
Tyler Buchner — 2021, Notre Dame quarterback 
Andrew Campbell — 2002, yachtsman, four-time All-American and 2008 Summer Olympics competitor
Andrew Cunanan — American spree killer
Gretel Ehrlich — 1963, travel writer, poet, and essayist
M.F.K. Fisher — 1927, epicurean, culinary historian, and memoirist
Marjory Gengler — 1969, tennis player
Edwin "Eddy" Glazener - 2012, Redwoods PLL Professional Lacrosse Defenseman
Jean Guerrero — 2006, investigative journalist, author, and former foreign correspondent
J. J. Isler — 1981, yachtswoman, 1992 Summer Olympics medalist and America's Cup competitor
Gary Jules — 1987, singer-songwriter
Eric Lax — 1962, editor, writer, and author
Elliott Liu — 2008, chess player
Chris McKenna — 1988, television writer, producer, and film writer
Inga Orekhova — 2009, professional basketball player
Roy Perkins — 2008, Paralympic swimmer, two-time Paralympic gold medalist 
Ankur Rathee — 2009, actor and dancer
Marc Rosen — 1994, film and television producer, executive or co-executive producing 40 hours of high-end ($4–$8mn/episode) scripted content, including Sense8 (Netflix)
Honoré Desmond Sharrer — 1938, painter in the style of Magical Realism
Kevin Stadler — 1998, professional golfer
Bonnie St. John — 1982, the first African American woman to win a silver medal at the Paralympics
Elise Trouw — 2017, pop/alternative/rock singer and multi-instrumentalist
Colin Walsh — 2007, Major League Baseball player
Shane Walton — 1998, NFL defensive back
Melissa Winter — 1984, Deputy Chief of Staff for First Lady Michelle Obama
+Andrew Cunanan - 1987, Murdered five people including Italian designer, Gianni Versace,

See also
 San Diego Historical Landmarks in La Jolla
Primary and secondary schools in San Diego, California

References

External links

 The Bishop's School
 The Bishop's School Athletics

Preparatory schools in California
High schools in San Diego
Private high schools in California
Private middle schools in California
La Jolla, San Diego
Irving Gill buildings
Landmarks in San Diego
Educational institutions established in 1909
1909 establishments in California
Episcopal schools in the United States